The 2005 French riots, was a three-week period of riots in the suburbs of Paris and other French cities, in October and November 2005. These riots involved youth in violent attacks, and the burning of cars and public buildings.

The unrest started on 27 October at Clichy-sous-Bois, where police were investigating a reported break-in at a building site, and a group of local youths scattered in order to avoid interrogation. Three of them hid in an electrical substation where two died from electrocution, resulting in a power blackout. (It was not established whether police had suspected these individuals or a different group, wanted on separate charges.) The incident ignited rising tensions about youth unemployment and police harassment in the poorer housing estates, and there followed three weeks of rioting throughout France.  A state of emergency was declared on 8 November, later extended for three weeks.

The riots resulted in more than 8,000 vehicles being burned by the rioters and more than 2,760 individuals arrested.

Triggering event

Citing two police investigations, The New York Times reported that the incident began at 17:20 on Thursday, 27 October 2005 in Clichy-sous-Bois when police were called to a construction site to investigate a possible break-in. Three teenagers, chased by the police, climbed a wall to hide in a power substation. Six youths were detained by 17:50. During questioning at the police station in Livry-Gargan at 18:12, blackouts occurred at the station and in nearby areas. The police said that these were caused by the electrocution of two boys, Zyed Benna and Bouna Traoré; a third boy, Muhittin Altun, suffered electric shock injury from the power substation they were hiding in. The New York Times wrote:

There is controversy over whether the teens were actually being chased. The local prosecutor, François Molins, said that although they believed so, the police were actually after other suspects attempting to avoid an identity check.

This event ignited pre-existing tensions. Protesters told The Associated Press the unrest was an expression of frustration with high unemployment and police harassment and brutality. "People are joining together to say we've had enough", said one protester. "We live in ghettos. Everyone lives in fear." The rioters' suburbs are also home to a large, mostly North African and Sub-Saharan African, immigrant population, allegedly adding religious tensions, which some commentators believed contribute further to such frustrations and the discrimination against Muslims after the September 11 attacks and the Iraq War of the Bush administration. However, according to Pascal Mailhos, head of the Renseignements Généraux (French intelligence agency) radical Islamism or Islamic terrorism had no influence over the 2005 civil unrest in France.

Timeline 

While tension had been building among the juvenile population in France, action was not taken until the reopening of schools in autumn, since most of the French population is on holiday during the summer months.  However, on 27 October 2005, in Clichy-sous-Bois, late in the afternoon, about ten residents came back on foot from the stadium, where they spent the afternoon playing football. Along the way, they walked near a big building site. A local resident reported an attempted robbery near the construction site to police which then sent a car. The national police tried to arrest six French youths of African or North African origin: four in the Vincent Auriol park and two others in the cemetery which adjoins the electrical substation EDF (Electricité de France) where three others who escaped took refuge – Bouna Traoré (15 years), Zyed Benna (17 years), and Muhittin Altun (17 years). Trying to hide in the electrical substation, Bouna Traoré and Zyed Benna died by electrocution. The third, Muhittin Altun, was seriously burned, but recovered and returned to the district. Shortly after this incident, riots began. Initially confined to the Paris area, the unrest subsequently spread to other areas of the Île-de-France région, and spread through the outskirts of France's urban areas, also affecting some rural areas. After 3 November it spread to other cities in France, affecting all 15 of the large aires urbaines in the country. Thousands of vehicles were burned, and at least one person was killed by the rioters. Close to 2900 rioters were arrested.

On 8 November, President Jacques Chirac declared a state of emergency, effective at midnight. Despite the new regulations, riots continued, though on a reduced scale, the following two nights, and again worsened the third night. On 9 November and the morning of 10 November a school was burned in Belfort, and there was violence in Toulouse, Lille, Strasbourg, Marseille, and Lyon.

On 10 November and the morning of 11 November, violence increased overnight in the Paris region, and there were still a number of police wounded across the country. According to the Interior Minister, violence, arson, and attacks on police worsened on the 11th and morning of the 12th, and there were further attacks on electricity substations, causing a blackout in the northern part of Amiens.

Rioting took place in the city center of Lyon on Saturday, 12 November, as young people attacked cars and threw rocks at riot police who responded with tear gas. Also that night, a nursery school was torched in the southern town of Carpentras.

On the night of the 14th and the morning of the 15th, 215 vehicles were burned across France and 71 people were arrested. Thirteen vehicles were torched in central Paris, compared to only one the night before. In the suburbs of Paris, firebombs were thrown at the treasury in Bobigny and at an electrical transformer in Clichy-sous-Bois, the neighborhood where the disturbances started. A daycare centre in Cambrai and a tourist agency in Fontenay-sous-Bois were also attacked. Eighteen buses were damaged by arson at a depot in Saint-Étienne. The mosque in Saint-Chamond was hit by three firebombs, which did little damage.

163 vehicles went up in flames on the 20th night of unrest, 15 to 16 November, leading the French government to claim that the country was returning to an "almost normal situation". During the night's events, a Roman Catholic church was burned and a vehicle was rammed into an unoccupied police station in Romans-sur-Isère. In other incidents, a police officer was injured while making an arrest after youths threw bottles of acid at the town hall in Pont-l'Évêque, and a junior high school in Grenoble was set on fire. Fifty arrests were carried out across the country.

On 16 November, the French parliament approved a three-month extension of the state of emergency (which ended on 4 January 2006) aimed at curbing riots by urban youths. The Senate on Wednesday passed the extension – a day after a similar vote in the lower house. The laws allow local authorities to impose curfews, conduct house-to-house searches and ban public gatherings. The lower house passed them by a 346–148 majority, and the Senate by 202–125.

Salah Gaham's death

Salah Gaham was a French concierge, born in Algeria. On the night of 2 November 2005, three cars were burned in the basement of the Forum, the building where he worked. He attempted to extinguish the fire but fell unconscious due to smoke inhalation. Firefighters attempted to resuscitate him but were unsuccessful. He died at the age of 34; this was the first death caused by the period of civil unrest. The mayor honored him by placing his name on a local street near the Forum. The street is called "Salah Gaham Square," and is marked by a commemorative plaque.

Murders of Jean-Claude Irvoas and Jean-Jacques Le Chenadec

On 27 October, Jean-Claude Irvoas, 56, was beaten to death by rioters, after being robbed while he was taking photographs of a street-lamp for his work in Epinay-sur-Seine, Seine-Saint-Denis. On 4 November, Jean-Jacques Le Chenadec, 61, fell into a coma after being hit by Salaheddine Alloul, 22, and died a few days later. The victim was trying to extinguish a trash bin fire near his home at Stains, Seine-Saint-Denis.

Context

Commenting on other demonstrations in Paris a few months later, the BBC summarised reasons behind the events included youth unemployment and lack of opportunities in France's poorest communities.

The head of the Direction centrale des renseignements généraux found no Islamic factor in the riots, while the New York Times reported on 5 November 2005 that "majority of the youths committing the acts are Muslim, and of African or North African origin" local youths adding that "many children of native French have also taken part."

The BBC reported that French society's negative perceptions of Islam and social discrimination of immigrants had alienated some French Muslims and may have been a factor in the causes of the riots: "Islam is seen as the biggest challenge to the country's secular model in the past 100 years". It was reported that there was discontent and a sense of alienation felt by many French Muslims and North African immigrants in the suburbs of French cities. However, the editorial also questioned whether or not such alarm is justified, citing that France's Muslim ghettos are not hotbeds of separatism and that "the suburbs are full of people desperate to integrate into the wider society."

Assessment of rioting

Summary statistics

 Started: 17:20 on Thursday, 27 October 2005 in Clichy-sous-Bois.
 Towns affected: 274 (on 7 November)
 Property damage: 8,973 vehicles (Not including buildings).
 Monetary damage: Estimated at €200 Million.

 Arrests: 2,888
 Deaths: 3 (Salah Gaham, Jean-Claude Irvoas and Jean-Jacques Le Chenadec)
 Police and firefighters injured: 126

Figures and tables
Note: In the table and charts, events reported as occurring during a night and the following morning are listed as occurring on the day of the morning. The timeline article does the opposite.

Response

Allegations of an organized plot and Nicolas Sarkozy's comments
Nicolas Sarkozy, interior minister at the time, declared a "zero tolerance" policy towards urban violence after the fourth night of riots and announced that 17 companies of riot police (CRS) and seven mobile police squadrons (escadrons de gendarmerie mobile) would be stationed in contentious Paris neighborhoods.

The families of the two dead youths, after refusing to meet with Sarkozy, met with Prime Minister Dominique de Villepin. Azouz Begag, delegate minister for the promotion of equal opportunity, criticized Sarkozy for the latter's use of "imprecise, warlike semantics", while Marie-George Buffet, secretary of the French Communist Party, criticized an "unacceptable strategy of tension" and "the not less inexcusable definition of French youth as 'thugs'" (racaille, a term considered by some to bear implicit racial and ethnic resonances) by the Interior Minister, Sarkozy. Buffet also called for the creation of a Parliamentary commission to investigate the circumstances of the death of the two young people, which ignited the riots.

State of emergency and measures concerning immigration policy
President Jacques Chirac announced a national state of emergency on 8 November. The same day, Lilian Thuram, a famous Football player and member of the Higher Council for Integration, blamed Sarkozy. He explained that discrimination and unemployment were at the root of the problem. On 9 November 2005, Nicolas Sarkozy issued an order to deport foreigners convicted of involvement, provoking concerns from left-wing politicians. He told parliament that 120 foreigners, "not all of whom are here illegally" – had been called in by police and accused of taking part in the nightly attacks. "I have asked the prefects to deport them from our national territory without delay, including those who have a residency visa", he said. The far-right French politician Jean-Marie Le Pen agreed, stating that naturalized French rioters should have their citizenship revoked. The Syndicat de la Magistrature, a magistrate trade-union, criticized Sarkozy's attempts to make believe that most rioters were foreigners, whereas the huge majority of them were French citizens. A demonstration against the expulsion of all foreign rioters and demanding the end of the state of emergency was called for on 15 November in Paris by left-wing and human rights organizations.

On 20 November 2005, Prime Minister Dominique de Villepin announced tightened controls on immigration: Authorities will increase enforcement of requirements that immigrants seeking 10-year residency permits or French citizenship master the French language and integrate into society. Chirac's government also plans to crack down on fraudulent marriages that some immigrants use to acquire residency rights and launch a stricter screening process for foreign students. Anti-racism groups widely opposed the measures, saying that greater government scrutiny of immigrants could stir up racism and racist acts and that energy and money was best deployed for other uses than chasing an ultra-minority of fraudsters.

Police
An extra 2,600 police were drafted on 6 November. On 7 November, French premier, Dominique de Villepin,  announced on the TF1 television channel the deployment of 18,000 police officers, supported by a 1,500 strong reserve. Sarkozy also suspended eight police officers for beating up someone they had arrested after TV displayed the images of this act of police brutality.

Media coverage
Jean-Claude Dassier, News director general at the private channel TF1 and one of France's leading TV news executives, admitted to self censoring the coverage of the riots in the country for fear of encouraging support for far-right politicians; while public television station France 3 stopped reporting the numbers of torched cars, apparently in order not to encourage "record making" between delinquent groups.

Foreign news coverage was criticized by president Chirac as showing in some cases excessiveness (démesure) and Prime Minister de Villepin said in an interview to CNN that the events should not be called riots, as the situation was not violent to the extent of the 1992 Los Angeles riots, with no death casualties being reported during the unrest itself – although it had begun after the deaths of two youth pursued by the police.

Backlash against French hip hop artists
French rappers and hip hop artists were accused of inciting the youth of the banlieues to riot.  After the riots, 200 French parliament members called for legal action against several French rappers, accusing them of inciting the violence.

Judicial consequences 
After ten years of preliminary proceedings, a trial was held in March 2015 against the police officers that were involved on the night when the deaths of Zyed Benna and Bouna Traore took place. The trial ended up without any convictions, which triggered an outcry from some members of the public.

See also

Summary and map of the 2005 French riots
1992 Los Angeles riots
West Las Vegas riots
Watts riots
Zoot Suit Riots
2005 Belfast riots
2006 Brussels riots
2007 Villiers-le-Bel riots
2008–09 Oslo riots
2009 French riots
2010 Rinkeby riots
2011 English riots
2013 Stockholm riots
2013 Trappes riots
2013 Belfast riots
2016 Sweden riots
2017 French riots
May 68
Migration
List of riots

Notes
Planoise-reflexion (In French) 
Besançon.fr (In French)
 Article from Le Monde
 "Scotsman" on renewal of state of emergency
 Indymedia on renewal of state of emergency, #torched cars
 "Each night between 40 and 60 cars are torched" according to the Council of State in Le Canard enchaîné #4442, 14 December 2005.
 Renewal of state of emergency (article from Le Monde)

References

Further reading
 Ali, Ameer. "From Islamophobia to Westophobia: The long road to radical Islamism." Journal of Asian Security and International Affairs 3.1 (2016): 1–19.
 Chabal, Emile. "From the banlieue to the burkini: the many lives of French republicanism." Modern & Contemporary France (2016): 1–7.
 Haddad, Yvonne Yazbeck,  and Michael J. Balz, "The October Riots in France: A Failed Immigration Policy or the Empire Strikes Back?" International Migration (2006) 44#2 pp 23–34.
 Hussey, Andrew. The French Intifada: the long war between France and its Arabs (Macmillan, 2014).
 Jobard, Fabien. "Rioting as a political tool: the 2005 riots in France." The Howard Journal of Criminal Justice (2009) 48#3 pp: 235–244.
 Mucchielli, Laurent. "Autumn 2005: A review of the most important riot in the history of French contemporary society." Journal of Ethnic and Migration Studies (2009) 35#5 pp: 731–751.
 Murray, Graham. "France: the riots and the Republic." Race & Class (2006) 47#4 pp: 26–45.
 Schneider, Cathy Lisa. "Police Power and Race Riots in Paris," Politics & Society (2008) 36#1 pp 133–159 
 Snow, David A., Rens Vliegenthart, and Catherine Corrigall-Brown. "Framing the French riots: A comparative study of frame variation." Social Forces (2007) 86#2 pp: 385–415.
 Wihtol de Wenden, Catherine. "Urban riots in France." SAIS Review  (2006) 26#2 pp: 47–53. Online

Contemporary news reports and essays

 Durand, Jacky Libération (29 October 2005), "Pompier façon légion romaine" (Firefighters à la roman legion)
 New Straits Times, p. 28 (8 November 2005), "Fatwa against riot issued"
 New Straits Times, p. 28 (8 November 2005), "French violence rages on"
 Rousseau, Ingrid Associated Press (31 October 2005), "France to Step Up Security After Riots"
 Gecker, Jocelyn Associated Press (2 November 2005), "French government in crisis mode"
 Gecker, Jocelyn Associated Press (2 November 2005), "Seventh Day of Violence Erupts Near Paris" by
 Keaten, Jamey  Associated Press (3 November 2005), "French residents can only watch amid riots"
 ABC News (4 November 2005), "Paris Riots in Perspective". .
 New Straits Times, p. 24. (5 November 2005), "Riots spread to suburbs".
 Heneghan, Tom Reuters (5 November 2005), "Paris seeks 'hidden hands' in riots"
 Reuters (6 November 2005), "France's Chirac says restoring order top priority"
 Bouteldja, Naima Red Pepper "Paris is burning" (9 November 2005)
 Sciolino, Elaine The New York Times (10 November 2005), "Chirac, Lover of Spotlight, Avoids Glare of France's Fires"
 Neue Zürcher Zeitung (11 November 2005), "Die Banlieues kommen nicht zur Ruhe" ("The suburbs do not get quiet")
 BBC News (17 November 2005), "French violence 'back to normal'"
 French Riots: A Failure of the Elite, Not the Republic, JURIST
 French Riots: A Wake-up Call for the West, The Indypendent
 French Right Reviles Rappers, The Indypendent

External links

Photographs
La Repubblica image gallery
Pictures from the BBC
Map of affected areas as of 7 November
Photos of Clichy-Sous-Bois, Montfermeil, and Aubervilliers

Analysis
Emmanuel Todd interview on the 'French riots' translation of an interview of Emmanuel Todd with Le Monde
 Essays about the riots written by social scientists
 A left wing analysis, in French of the crisis in the banlieues
 Nous les zonards voyous, n+1 review
  Rioting in France: What's Wrong with Europe? – Der Spiegel

 L'Humanité in English  (search "riots", "sarkozy", "November", etc.)
 One Year After the Uprising in the French Suburbs: We Can't Afford to Forget Them, L'Humanite in English.
 Op-ed in Liberation by Jean Baudrillard
 Some politically incorrect reflexions on violence in France by Slavoj Žižek, on Multitudes website
 The Guardian: Questions over the country's ability to integrate its Muslim population
 ZMag: Why is France Burning?
 Spiked Magazine: Letter from a Burning Banlieue, by Patrick Belton (who also wrote about the riots from Aulnay-sous-Bois on OxBlog)
 Working Class France... by Matthieu Kassovitz (director of the film La Haine)
 in French workplace LA Times, 26 November 2005, Sebastian Rotella (mentions a report published shortly before unrest began)
 WHY IS FRANCE BURNING? The rebellion of a lost generation, by Doug Ireland, an indepth look at what led to the riots
 Rioting in France: Le Mal Français. Decline and Fall of the French Model..., by Benjamin Sehene (Writer of Rwandan origin of Le feu sous la Soutane)
 
 Ethnicity and Equality: France in the Balance by Azouz Begag,translated and with an introduction by Alec G. Hargreaves (Nebraska, 2007)
 Irina Mihalache, Imagining the Diasporic Link: The Franco-Algerian Media Dialogues on the 2005 'Emeutes' in France, Cultural Shifts, 2008.

Eyewitness blog reports

Paris Rioting – a digest of francophone blogs

French
Riots
2005 in Paris
Riots
Riots
2005 riots
Race riots in France
Riots, 2005
Protests in the European Union
Emergency laws in France
Contemporary French history
Intifadas
History of Paris
Seine-Saint-Denis
Jacques Chirac